Luuurve is a Many Trousered Thing (2007) is the eighth novel in the Georgia Nicolson series written by Louise Rennison. It was published in July 2007. It is sold as Love is a Many Trousered Thing in the United States.

It follows Georgia as she struggles to decide which boy to go out with: the Sex God (Robbie) or the Luuurve God (the Italian Stallion also known as Massimo). She also finds herself emotionally involved with Dave the Laugh, although he seems to be acting very strangely.

2007 British novels
British young adult novels
British comedy novels
Fictional diaries
Confessions of Georgia Nicolson
HarperCollins books